Torrey Josef Mosvold (9 July 1910 – 18 October 1995) was one of Norway's leading shipping and industrial entrepreneurs.

Torrey Josef Mosvold was born in Farsund in the county of Vest-Agder, Norway. He was the son of Nils Martin Mosvold (1876-1956) who founded the Mosvold Shipping Group in 1910. Torrey married Gudny Langeland and they had 6 children. Gudny died in 1954. After Martin Mosvold died 1956,  the original company interests were split between his sons.

Torrey Mosvold was director of the Norwegian Shipowners' Association (Norges Rederiforbund) as well as of several companies  with which Mosvold Shipping Group was associated. He was a member of the national board of the Mission Covenant Church of Norway. He was a patron of the Mosvold Hospital  in Ingwavuma, in the Republic of South Africa. He was proclaimed Commander of the Royal Norwegian Order of St. Olav in 1971.

Torrey Mosvold has 31 grandchildren.

References

External links
Mosvold Hospital
Facebook-group for Torrey Mosvold´s grandkids

1910 births
1995 deaths
Norwegian businesspeople in shipping
People from Farsund